The 2007 edition of the Paris–Nice stage race took place from March 11 until March 18 on the 2007 UCI ProTour. Contador broke away on the Col d'Eze, the last climb of the race, to claim both the stage victory along the Promenade des Anglais and the overall race victory.

Stages

Prologue - 11-03-2007: Issy-les-Moulineaux, 4.7 km (ITT)

Stage 1 - 12-03-2007: Cloyes sur le Loir – Buzançais, 186 km

Stage 2 - 13-03-2007: Vatan – Limoges, 177 km

Stage 3 - 14-03-2007: Limoges – Maurs, 215.5 km

Stage 4 - 15-03-2007: Maurs – Mende, 169.5 km

Stage 5 - 16-03-2007: Sorgues – Manosque, 178 km

Stage 6 - 17-03-2007: Brignoles – Cannes, 200 km.

Stage 7 - 18-03-2007: Nice, 129.5 km circuit race

Final standings

General classification

Mountains classification

Points classification

Best Young Rider

Best Team

Jersey progress

References
Race website
cyclingnews

Paris-Nice
Paris–Nice
Paris-Nice
Paris-Nice